Stigmella zangherii is a moth of the family Nepticulidae. It is widespread in south-eastern Europe and Turkey, in the north to the Czech Republic and Slovakia, in the west a single specimen was recorded from south-eastern France. There are further records from eastern Austria, Hungary, mainland Italy, Sicily, Slovenia, Croatia, Yugoslavia, Greece and Turkey.

The wingspan is 3.9-5.5 mm. Adults are on wing from May to September.

The larvae feed on Quercus cerris, Quercus macrolepis, Quercus pubescens, Quercus suber and Quercus trojana. They mine the leaves of their host plant. The mine consists of a fairly slender corridor. The frass is concentrated in a central band that occupies about two thirds of the width of the gallery.

External links
Fauna Europaea
bladmineerders.nl
The Quercus Feeding Stigmella Species Of The West Palaearctic: New Species, Key And Distribution (Lepidoptera: Nepticulidae)

Nepticulidae
Moths of Europe
Moths described in 1951